Spicy Teacher is a 2000 Taiwanese drama starring William Hsieh, Ye Min-Zhi, Jade Chia, Jean Kuo, Tu Shih-Mei. It is the first school life comedy in Taiwanese television, inspired by the Japanese manga series Great Teacher Onizuka (グレート・ティーチャー・オニヅカ, Gurēto Tīchā Onizuka) by Tooru Fujisawa. It is the longest broadcast school life comedy and the school life comedy series with the most episodes in Taiwan. It became the television show with the most re-runs in Taiwan. Since it is a light comedy set in high school, it became a popular show for new actors with little prior acting experience to start their careers.  Various actors, such as Jerry Yan, Lan Cheng-lung, Will Pan, Ady An, and Weber Yang, later went on to become successful in the industry, so the show is often called an "Idol maker" or "Idol workshop".

Synopsis 
Hsu Lei (William Hsieh) is not the typical teacher. An ex-gang member, he often uses unorthodox methods to help solve the problems of his students. Along with his coworkers Dean Huang (Ye Min-Zhi), Ms. Tong (Jade Chia), and Ms. Wan (Jean Ku)), Hsu tries to provide the best education, whether in academics or life, to his students, including Lu Xiaoman (Tu Shih-Mei) and many others.

Cast 

 William Hsieh as Hsu Lei
 Ye Min-Zhi as Dean Huang 
 Jade Chia as Ms. Tong
 Jean Kuo as Ms. Wan

Production 
Season 1 to 3 were filmed at Paul Hsu Senior High School in Guishan District, Taoyuan City.

Season 4 and 5 were filmed at Dunxu High School of Industry and Commerce in Beitou District, Taipei.

Film 
A movie based on the series,  was released on August 30, 2018. It is set ten years after the original series.

References

External links 

 Official Site - GTV Variety Show
 Official Site - aTV

2000s high school television series
2002 Taiwanese television series debuts
2001 Taiwanese television series debuts
2000 Taiwanese television series debuts
Television series about educators